Aspergillus brevipes is an anamorph species of fungus in the genus Aspergillus. It is from the Fumigati section.  It was first described in 1952. It has been isolated from soil in Australia. Aspergillus brevipes produces roquefortine C, meleagrin and viriditoxin.

Growth and morphology
A. brevipes has been cultivated on both Czapek yeast extract agar (CYA) plates and Malt Extract Agar Oxoid® (MEAOX) plates. The growth morphology of the colonies can be seen in the pictures below.

References

Further reading 
 
 
 
 
 

brevipes
Fungi described in 1952